Sunday in August is a 1950 Italian comedy film directed by Luciano Emmer. The film was nominated for a BAFTA.

Cast

Anna Baldini: Marcella Meloni
Vera Carmi: Adriana
Emilio Cigoli: Alberto Mantovani
Franco Interlenghi: Enrico
Elvy Lissiak: Luciana
Massimo Serato: Roberto
Mario Vitale: Renato
Marcello Mastroianni: Ercole Nardi
Anna Medici: Rosetta
Andrea Compagnoni: Cesare Meloni
Ave Ninchi: Fernanda Meloni 
Salvo Libassi: Perrone
Jone Morino: Mesmè

External links

1950 films
Italian black-and-white films
1950s Italian-language films
1950 comedy films
Films directed by Luciano Emmer
Films set in Rome
Films shot in Rome
Italian comedy films
1950s Italian films